The Simmental or Swiss Fleckvieh is a Swiss breed of dual-purpose cattle. It is named after the Simmental – the valley of the Simme river – in the Bernese Oberland, in the canton of Bern in Switzerland. It is reddish in colour with white markings, and is raised for both milk and meat.

History

European origin 

Among the older and most widely distributed of all breeds of cattle in the world, and recorded since the Middle Ages, the Simmental breed has contributed to the creation of several other famous European breeds, including the Montbéliarde (France), the Pezzata Rossa d'Oropa (Italy), and the Fleckvieh (Germany and Austria).

Africa 

Namibia (1893) and South Africa (1905) were the first countries outside Europe where the breed was successfully established. Here the breed is known as Simmentaler and is mainly used for beef cattle production under suckler cow systems. The Simmentaler breeders' society is, as far as registered animals are concerned, by far the largest of the 17 European and British breeds. The main reasons for its popularity are (i) it can be used with great success in crossbreeding for breeding of both cows with much milk and heavy weaners/oxen, (ii) its superb weight growth rate in feedlots - pure or crossed, and (iii) a strict visual inspection is compulsory for registration in the Herdbook.

Soviet Union 

In the former Soviet Union, the Simmental was the most important cattle breed. Russian Simmental (Симментальская корова) accounted for one-quarter of all cattle in the USSR. Through extensive crossbreeding, six strains were developed:
 Steppe Simmental (Russian cattle × Simmental bulls)
 Ukrainian Simmental (Grey steppe cattle × Simmental bulls)
 Volga Simmental (Central Russian Kalmyk and Kazakh cattle × Simmental bulls)
 Ural Simmental (Siberian and Kazakh cattle × Simmental)
 Siberian Simmental (Siberian and Buryat cattle × Simmental)
 Far Eastern Simmental (Transbaikal and Yakutian cattle × Simmental)
In 1990, there were 12,849,800 Simmental in the USSR. In 2003, the Simmental count in Russia stood at 2,970,400.

Different names
The breed is known under the following names
 Fleckvieh Simmental: Argentina
 Simmental: Australia, Brazil, Bulgaria, Canada, Colombia, Denmark, France (early 1990s name change from Pie Rouge), Ireland, Mexico, New Zealand, Poland, Sweden, Switzerland (SI-division), United Kingdom, USA, Zambia and Zimbabwe
 Fleckvieh: Austria, Germany, Netherland, Spain, Switzerland (SF-division) and Uruguay
 Simmentaler: South Africa and Namibia
 Local names based on the breed-name used in the official breed association names which boil down to "spotted cattle": Bosnia-Herzegovina, Croatia, Czech Republic, Hungary, Romania, Serbia, Slovakia, Slovenia. Most of these countries use Simmental as a translation of their local name. 
Pezzata Rossa: Italy.
Montbéliarde: A French dairy breed. Member of European Simmental Federation but not of the World Simmental-Fleckvieh Federation.

Characteristics

Traditional
The Simmental has historically been used for dairy and beef, and as draught animals. They are particularly renowned for the rapid growth of their young, if given sufficient feed. Simmentals provide more combined weaning gain (growth) and milk yield than any other breed.

Africa
In contrast to countries which allow black and solid brown coloured Simmental in the herdbook, Namibia and South Africa only register Simmentaler with the typical colour i.e. from dark red or brown to yellow spread over the body in any pattern with at least some white on the forehead and the lower-leg area, solid black or solid red animals are non-existent because they are not registered.

Types
No other breed in the world has such a large within-breed-type variation as Simmental-Fleckvieh which is classifiable in the following types: 
 Dairy type like specialised dairy breeds (referring to Swiss Fleckvieh (code SF) with over 55% Red Holstein blood and the French Montebeliard breed);
 Dual purpose but major emphasis on milk;
 Truly dual-purpose (all cows are milked and bulls excel in weight gain);
 Moderate beef type (suckler, extensive ranching with moderate to small frame size);
 Extreme beef type (suckler, comparable to specialised beef breeds like for example Charolais, large frame size).

The traditional colouration of the Simmental has been described variously as "red and white spotted" or "gold and white", although there is no specific standard colouration, and the dominant shade varies from a pale yellow-gold all the way to very dark red (the latter being particularly popular in the United States).  The face is normally white, and this characteristic is usually passed to crossbred calves.  The white face is genetically distinct from the white head of the Hereford.

See also
French Simmental
Fleckvieh cattle

References

External links
Official website of the Danish Simmental Association
Official website of the Canadian Simmental Association
American Simmental Association – Official website of the American Simmental Association
Simmental New Zealand – Official website of the New Zealand Simmental Cattle Breeders Association
Simmental Breed Information – Cattle.com
A History of the Simmental Breed – Oklahoma State University
Official website of the Simmentaler in Southern Africa

de:Fleckvieh

Cattle breeds
Cattle breeds originating in Switzerland